Paraholopterini is a tribe of beetles in the subfamily Cerambycinae, containing the single genus Paraholopterus and the single species Paraholopterus nahuelbutensis.

References

Cerambycinae
Monotypic beetle genera